Lê Lựu (12 December 1942 – 9 November 2022) was a Vietnamese writer specializing in novels and short stories. He was a member of the Vietnam Writers Association from 1974 until his death. He was the director of the Culture and Entrepreneurs Centre in Hanoi.

His best known novel is Thời xa vắng. This was filmed by director Hồ Quang Minh, Le temps révolu, and released to the public in 2004 with music by Đặng Hữu Phúc.

Works
:vi:Thời xa vắng ("Time gone by," French "Le temps révolu,") 1986
Sóng ở đáy sông, 1994
Chuyện làng Cuội, 1991
:vi:Người cầm súng, 1970
Mở rừng, 1976
Truyện ngắn Lê Lựu, 2003

References

1942 births
2022 deaths
People from Hưng Yên Province
20th-century Vietnamese writers
20th-century male writers
20th-century novelists
20th-century short story writers
21st-century Vietnamese writers
21st-century male writers
21st-century novelists
21st-century short story writers
Vietnamese male short story writers
Vietnamese short story writers
Vietnamese novelists
Male novelists